The second season of Alyas Robin Hood, is a 2017 Philippine television drama series on GMA Network, premiered on August 14, 2017 replacing My Love From The Star and taking the timeslot of Mulawin vs. Ravena, and concluded on November 24, 2017, with a total of 75 episodes. It was replaced by Kambal, Karibal on its timeslot.

Plot 
After the death of Sarri, the story of the main hero will continue to unfold about Judy and her kidnappers; as Pepe saves his mother, he unravel the truths about a new rebellion, about his real identity, and a new journey and missions of solving conspiracies along with Venus, the love of his life before their grand wedding of the century.

Cast and characters

Main cast 
Dingdong Dantes as Atty. Jose Paulo "Pepe" de Jesus Jr./Atty. Jose Paulo Albano/Alyas Robin Hood 
Andrea Torres as Venus Torralba/Felicidad/Marla/Aphrodite Mendoza
Ruru Madrid as Andres Silang/Yoyo Boy
Solenn Heussaff as Iris Rebecca Lizeralde

Supporting cast

Remaining 
Jaclyn Jose as Kapitana Judy de Jesus/Lola SadAko/Victorina Deogracia y Villadolid
Rey "PJ" Abellana as Leandro Torralba
Gio Alvarez as Jericho "Jekjek" Sumilang
Paolo Contis as Senior Inspector Daniel Acosta
Rob Moya as SPO2 Alex Cruz
Antonette Garcia as Frida
Luri Vincent Nalus as Junjun
Prince Villanueva as Rex

Additional 
Edu Manzano as Governor Emilio Albano
Jay Manalo as Pablo Rodrigo
KC Montero as SPO2 Rigor Morales
Super Tekla as Yvonne Lady
Kiel Rodriguez as SPO4 Brix Sandoval
Rodjun Cruz as SPO2 Miguel Chua
Geleen Eugenio as Yaya Chona
Kenken Nuyad as Totoy Bingo
Rochelle Pangilinan as Diana dela Vega

Flashback Appearances
Sid Lucero as Dean Balbuena
Cherie Gil as Margarita "Maggie" Balbuena
Christopher de Leon as Jose Paulo  de Jesus, Sr.
Megan Young as Dr. Sarri Acosta
Tanya Gomez as Kapitana Adelita Mayuga

Guest stars 
Empress Schuck as young Judy de Jesus
Gab de Leon as young Jose Paulo de Jesus Sr.
Arkin del Rosario as young Governor Emilio Albano
Hiro Peralta as Miguel Rodrigo
Ina Feleo as Rosetta Rodrigo
Elle Ramirez as Reporter Susan Meneses
Stephanie Sol as Rhodora 
Tess Bomb Maranon as Eloisa
Jason Francisco as Matias
Lharby Policarpio as Gerald 
Ces Aldaba as Judge
Crispin Pineda as Priest
Joshua Zamora as Benjo
Norman King as Abog
Lou Veloso as Tanglaw
Denise Barbacena as Prisoner 1
Arny Ross as Prisoner 2
Mara Alberto as Prisoner 3
Sheena Halili as Lily
Phytos Ramirez as Kevin
Kevin Sagra as Patrick
Karlo Duterte as Jason
Gabby Eigenmann as Doc Gabriel
Lotlot de Leon as Sionnie
Anette Samin as Missing child
Kiko Estrada as Iking
Mikee Quintos as Marya
Joe Gruta as Lolo Marcelino
Banjo Romero as Gusting
Dindo Arroyo as Boss Pacquito Domingo

Former cast

Supporting 
Lindsay de Vera as Lizzy de Jesus
Dave Bornea as Julian Balbuena
Gary Estrada as Carlos "Caloy" de Jesus

Episodes

Production

Timeslot changes 
It premiered on August 14, 2017 on the 7:45 PM slot, and GMA-7, the network behind the show, moved Mulawin vs. Ravena on the 8:30 PM slot. On September 18, 2017, following Super Ma'am's premiere, the network put it back on its original 8:30 PM slot.

References 

2017 Philippine television seasons